Gonzalo Herrero Agüeros (born 5 October 1989) is a Spanish footballer who plays as a right back.

Club career
Gonzalo was born in Santander, Cantabria. A product of local giants Racing de Santander's youth system, he made his debuts as a senior in the 2007–08 campaign, winning promotion from Tercera División.

Gonzalo made his first team debut on 13 December 2011, starting in a 3–2 home win against Rayo Vallecano, for the season's Copa del Rey. In July 2012, after the club's relegation from La Liga, he was promoted to the main squad and signed a three-year contract.

On 13 October 2012 Gonzalo made his league debut, replacing Francis in the 65th minute of a 1–1 away draw against Xerez CD in the Segunda División championship. On 5 September of the following year he was loaned to Segunda División B's CD Tropezón, in a season-long deal.

In February 2014, in a match against UD Logroñés, Gonzalo suffered a severe knee injury, being sidelined for the remainder of the season. In June, he was released by Racing.

References

External links
 Racing Santander official profile 
 
 Futbolme profile  
 

1989 births
Living people
Spanish footballers
Footballers from Santander, Spain
Association football defenders
Segunda División players
Segunda División B players
Tercera División players
Rayo Cantabria players
Racing de Santander players
CD Tropezón players